Robert John Appleby (born 18 November 1983), known professionally as Robert Kazinsky, is an English actor. He is known for his roles as Casper Rose in the Sky One drama Dream Team, the Don in Captain Marvel, Sean Slater in the BBC soap opera EastEnders, Chuck Hansen in Pacific Rim, and Macklyn Warlow in the sixth season of HBO's True Blood. In 2016, he played Orgrim Doomhammer in Warcraft and Jimmy Pritchard in the Fox television series Second Chance.

Early life
Kazinsky was born Robert John Appleby in Haywards Heath, Sussex, England on 18 November 1983. Kazinsky is Jewish. He is also a fluent speaker of Hebrew. Kazinsky was educated at Hove Park School in Hove as well as K-Bis Theatre School in Brighton, from 1995 to 2000. He appeared in their productions of Bugsy Malone and A Midsummer Night's Dream. Kazinsky trained as an actor at the Guildford School of Acting from September 2002 to July 2005. He took his grandfather's middle name as his stage name.

Career
He adopted his grandfather’s surname “Kazinsky” when he began his acting career. Kazinsky appeared in Israeli television commercials before he started acting. He made his acting debut in 2005, when he had a guest role in an episode of the CBBC children's programme The Basil Brush Show, playing a character named Sven Garley. Kazinsky then got a role in Sky One's football drama series Dream Team, in which he played Casper Rose from late 2005 to 2006, when he was killed off towards the end of the ninth series, after he announced his intention to leave.

Kazinsky next played Sean Slater in EastEnders; he made his first appearance on 22 August 2006. On 27 March 2007, Kazinsky was suspended from work on EastEnders for two months. A story in The People newspaper alleged that Kazinsky had bombarded a model with "obscene text messages and photographs." Kazinsky issued a statement apologising "for any offence caused and for bringing the show into disrepute". Kazinsky announced he would be leaving the show in October 2008 and made his last appearance in the show on 1 January 2009. On YouTube, Kazinsky was featured as the presenter in the EastEnders launch video when they launched their own video channel on the website.

He made his film debut in 2012 when director George Lucas offered him a part in his World War II film Red Tails, in which Kazinsky plays a "pilot who has to adapt to being among African-American comrades." In October 2010, Kazinsky was cast in the film The Hobbit: An Unexpected Journey. He would have played Fili, a member of the Company of Dwarves, but in April 2011, Kazinsky resigned from the role due to personal reasons. On 9 January 2011, he guest starred on the drama series Brothers & Sisters as Dr Rick Appleton.

On 13 November 2012, Kazinsky joined the cast of the sixth season of the fantasy drama series True Blood, which premiered in 2013. That same year, Kazinsky appeared in Guillermo del Toro's science-fiction monster film Pacific Rim, as Chuck Hansen, an Australian Jaeger pilot.

In March 2015, he was cast in the leading role in the Fox drama series Second Chance. His character, Jimmy Pritchard, was a murdered elderly ex-cop who is genetically brought back to life as a man in his mid-30s with unusual powers. The series debuted in 2016. Due to low ratings, it was cancelled after one series.

Kazinsky co-starred as Orgrim Doomhammer in the fantasy adventure film Warcraft, based on the video game of the same name which was released in May 2016. An avid World of Warcraft player, Kazinsky credits the game with giving him self-confidence during a period in which he would be harassed and attacked by people who confused him for the Sean Slater character.

In 2018, he appeared in the science-fiction film Mute which premiered on Netflix. In 2019, he had a cameo in the Marvel Cinematic Universe film Captain Marvel.

On 17 January 2019, it was announced that Kazinsky would reprise his role of Sean Slater for a guest appearance. He returned to EastEnders for a brief stint which commenced on 26 April 2019. Kazinsky returned for a further one-off appearance in the episode broadcast on 1 November 2021.

Filmography

Film

Television

Video games

Awards and nominations

References

External links
 

Living people
21st-century English male actors
Alumni of the Guildford School of Acting
English expatriates in the United States
English Jews
British people of Russian-Jewish descent
British people of Polish-Jewish descent
1983 births
English people of Polish-Jewish descent
English people of Russian-Jewish descent
English male soap opera actors
Jewish British male actors
People from Haywards Heath
British expatriate male actors in the United States